A 3-Pronged Parts Retriever, also known as a Pearl-Catcher, is a tool used by computer technicians.

Design
It consists of a length of tube of around 4 mm to 6 mm in diameter, often made of coiled steel springs, with a push-button on one end. Three metal wires protrude from the other end, each sprung to bend outwards, away from the tube's axis, but with their tips bent inwards to form teeth. The push-button drives the wires down the tube, where their natural springiness causes them to spread further outwards, opening the teeth. When the button is released, an internal spring withdraws the wires which, constrained by the tube, are forced together, closing the teeth.
By pressing the end of it, the user allows the teeth to open up and by releasing their hold, the teeth will grab whatever object is below the grabber.

Use
The tool is mainly used to retrieve screws, although is also helpful in retrieving jammed bits in the motherboard. They mainly come in sizes ranging from about 4 to 9 inches. The outer shell is usually plastic, although higher end retrievers can have metal casing and reinforced inner material.                                                                   
Other uses include, but are not limited to; paper removal, device handling, item manoeuvering, micro-cleaning, small parts retrieval and minor dust removal.

References

Lifting equipment